Cheetah Fotball Club is a Ghanaian football club based in Kasoa in the Central Region of Ghana. The club currently competes in Central Region Zone of the Division Two League which is the third tier of the football league system in Ghana, and the MTN FA Cup.

History 
In 2009, Abdul-Hayye Yartey, a Ghanaian sports executive and entrepreneur founded the club in Kasoa as a juvenile club. The club started scouting young prospects across Ghana and recruiting them to form a football club.

In 2021, the club was named on the top 10 clubs in Africa with the most outgoing transfers of players in FIFA's 2020 Global Transfer Market Report.

As of 2021, the team plays in the Central Regional Football Association (CRFA) Division Two League.

Some of the club's most notable players are Christian Atsu, Emmanuel Toku and Alhassan Wakaso amongst others.

Grounds 
In August 2020, the club began the construction of an AstroTurf for the use of the club. In June 2021 the club inaugurated as AstroTurf pitch which is reportedly the biggest in Ghana, called the Yartel Okoso park (The Predators Den) in Senya Beraku. From the inception of the club in 2009 till 2020, the club used the Kasoa pitch as their home venue.

Management

Notable players 
See:

References

External links 

 Cheetah FC on Footballdatabse.eu
 Cheetah FC on Global Sports Archive
 Official Website

Football clubs in Ghana
Association football clubs established in 2009
2009 establishments in Ghana